Turtel Onli (born January 25, 1952 in Chicago, Illinois) is an American artist, entrepreneur, author, art therapist, educator, and publisher.

Over Onli's career, his work has touched upon a variety of disciplines in fine and applied visual art, producing works in painting, drawing, illustration, publishing, fashion, and multimedia production. Onli has authored and illustrated numerous comic books and graphic novels, including NOG, Protector of the Pyramids, Malcolm 10, Nog Nu and Grammar Patrol.  He is known as "the Father" of the "Black Age of Comics," a movement dedicated to the promotion, creation, and support of Afrocentric comic books and graphic novels. Onli coined the term "Rhythmism" to define and interpret his stylizations, which fuse primitive and futuristic concepts. A public school art teacher, now retired, Onli worked in the Chicago Public Schools for more than two decades.

Biography

Education 
Onli graduated from the School of the Art Institute of Chicago with a Bachelor of Fine Arts. He later returned to the Art Institute and earned a Master of Arts in Art Therapy. His education includes studies in Paris, France, at The Sorbonne and the Centre Georges Pompidou.

Career 
In 1970, Onli founded the Black Arts Guild (BAG), which featured touring art exhibitions and published work by its members. In 1974, in conjunction with BAG, he published Funk Book and a series of greeting cards. In 1980, he co-published a zine called PAPER with the Osun Center of the Arts. In the early 1980s he created five issues of another early comics zine, Future Funk.

Onli's illustration clients include Playboy Magazine, Chicago Magazine, Avant Garde Magazine, McDonald's, Motown Productions, Holt, Rinehart & Winston, MODE magazine, and Paris Métro magazine. His work is in the collections of Miles Davis, Alice Coltrane, the Chicago Children's Museum (The Rhythmistic Bench), and Johnson Publishing Company.

Onli has been a visiting artist at the University of Illinois at Chicago.

In 2005, Onli curated "Reverend Phillips and Turtel Onli: An Artistic and Spiritual Legacy," at the Center for the Visual and Performing Arts in Munster, Indiana, an exhibition featuring the visionary charts created by his late grandfather, the Rev. Samuel David Phillips, and Onli's own Rhythmistic paintings.

In 2010 he opened the new Onli Studios at the Bridgeport Arts Center in Chicago.

Comics 

Throughout his career, Onli has created Afrocentric Rhythmistic-powered characters who tap into humanity’s innate attraction to exaggeration, the supernatural, and pseudo-theological mythology. They represent Onli's belief in the ideal of the powerful defending the weak. He uses the "hero vs. villain" paradigm as his vehicle for reaching beyond “perceived” norms.

Onli's character NOG, Nubian of Greatness, one of the earliest Afrocentric comic book characters, was featured in the Chicago Defender, starting in 1979, before transitioning to the comic book NOG, Protector of the Pyramides from 1981-82. NOG returned in NOG is Back!! in 1994 and  Nog Nu!! in 2011.

Black Age of Comics 
In 1993, Onli spearheaded the inaugural Black Age of Comics convention at the Southside Community Arts Center in Chicago, where it was held for three consecutive years. Black Age of Comics Conventions have since been held in Atlanta, Los Angeles, and Detroit; with Philadelphia's annual ECBACC being the most prominent. Other recent Black Age of Comics conventions were held in Chicago's Bridgeport Arts Center and Kenwood Academy.

Educator 
From 1984 to 1989 Onli worked as an art therapist with young people in Chicago's Robert Taylor Homes.

Onli worked as an art instructor in the Chicago Public Schools.

Onli has taught at Columbia College Chicago, and is currently an adjunct professor of Art Appreciation & Drawing at Harold Washington College.

Onli is also the Founder of B.A.G the Black Arts Guild where his “Rhythmistic” style and approach provides a futuristic think tank for young emerging artist to evolve in various mediums.

Honors and awards 
 2006: Glyph Comics Awards Pioneer Award — for bringing positive, diverse images to the world of graphic novels and comic books

Work

Bibliography 
 NOG: Protector of the Pyramides (self-published, 1981–1982)
 Future Funk (BAG, 1980s)
 Malcolm 10 (self-published, 1992)
 Sustah-Girl (Castel Publications, 1993) — with Cassandra Washington
 Grammar Patrol (Castel Publications, 1994) — with Cassandra Washington
 Nog is Back (self-published, 1994)
 The Origins of Team Blanga: Heroes of the Black Age (Onli Studios, 2007) — includes an original CD soundtrack by Hardy Headz
 Let's Go Green in the City (Onli Studios, 2008)
 Sasa (Onli Studios, 2010)
 Nog Nu!! (Onli Studios, 2011)
 East/West Zodiac & Journal (Onli Studios) — with Kocao Winbush
 The Legend of the AZANIAC

Exhibitions 
 1977: Second World Festival of Black and African Art and Culture (FESTAC) (Lagos, Nigeria) — group show
 1991: Prairie Avenue Gallery (Chicago, Illinois) — "The Return of Watermelon: The Redefining of a Stereotype" — group show
 2001: The African American Cultural Center (Chicago)
 2005: Center for the Visual and Performing Arts (Munster, Indiana) — “Reverend Phillips and Turtel Onli: An Artistic and Spiritual Legacy”
 2007: "Cool Globes: Hot Ideas for a Cooler Planet Chicago" group show — "It'z A Rhythmsitic World." Never Boring!!!“
 2011: Tubman African American Museum (Macon, Georgia) — "Afro Futurism in the Visual Arts" — group show
 2011: ETA Creative Arts Foundation (Chicago) — “Passion Fruit: The Other Chicago Black Movement” — solo exhibition
 2013: DuSable Museum of African American History (Chicago) — "AFRICOBRA: Art and Impact" — group show
 2015: Harold Washington Library Center (Chicago) — Rhythmistic Journey: The Art Enterprises of Turtel Onli
 2020: Hyde Park Arts Center (Chicago) "Rhythmistic Residency"

References

Notes

Sources consulted 
 Chicago Sun-Times (Apr. 17, 1981).
 Lacher, Irene. "Comics Open the Door to Minority Heroes," Chicago Sun-Times (28 Nov 1993), p. 18. 
 Wisconsin State Journal (Jan. 31, 1994).
 Irvine, Martha. "Giving drawing power to black heroes: A handful of artists, some self-published, cross racial-ethnic lines in comic books," Associated Press (07 Sept. 1999).
 Jennings, John and Duffy, Damian, curators. Other Heroes: African American Comic Book Characters and Archetypes (art exhibition catalog), (Other Heroes, 2007).
 Onli, Turtel. "The Black Age of Comics 101: A Brief History by a Founder," Chicago Art Magazine (Oct 15, 2010).
 Richardson, Clem. "Super Heroic Fest Will Highlight African-American Comic Book Pioneers," New York Daily News (10 Jan 2013), p. 39.

External links 
 
 Onli website
 "The Art of Turtel Onli," Onli's blog
 Onli profile, Lambiek Comiclopedia. Accessed May 20, 2013.
 Onli profile, PocketCon 2013 official website. Accessed May 20, 2013.
 Onli profile, ArtFacts.net
 Onli web page, African American Cultural Center at the University of Illinois at Chicago
 Cool Globes Public Art Exhibition
 The Black Age of Comics website
 “Rhythmistic Residency #1 HPAC July 22nd 2020", Rhythmistic Residency Vimeo
 Hyde Park Arts Center Residency HPA.ORG official website. Accessed July 2020.
 "Rhythmistic Residency #2 HPAC July 29th 2020", Rhythmistic Residency Vimeo

African-American comics creators
American comics creators
American comics artists
Living people
1952 births
Artists from Chicago
21st-century African-American people
20th-century African-American people